Rachel J. Watkins  is an American biocultural anthropologist and educator. Her research focuses on the physiological impact of poverty and inequality on the human body, with an emphasis "on the biological and social history of African Americans living in the 19th and 20th century urban US".

Watkins currently is an associate professor in the Department of Anthropology at the American University in Washington DC. She is conducting a long term study on the W. Montague Cobb skeletal collection, which is composed of remains of African-Americans who died in Washington D.C. between 1930 and 1969

Education
Watkins obtained a BA in Anthropology from Howard University in 1994, a MAA in Applied Anthropology from University of Maryland, College Park in 1996 and a PhD in Anthropology from the University of North Carolina, Chapel Hill in 2003.

Career
Watkins is carrying on the work of African-American anthropologists William Montague Cobb and Caroline Bond Day.
After obtaining her PhD, Watkins spent a year researching urban African-American populations in the Southeast and East Coast of the United States.

Cobb, whose work has influenced Watkins's research, demonstrated the effect of race on human health. He assembled the collection of skeletons that Watkins is studying. The collection, which resides at Howard University,  contains more than 600 skeletons of African Americans who were buried in Washington, D.C. between 1930 and 1969.

Watkins considers herself a scholar-advocate. She primarily studies African Americans and Native Americans, minorities who historically have not been fairly represented in anthropological studies. She hopes to give these underrepresented minorities a voice and to encourage more people of color to join the field of anthropology.

Watkins teaches classes on race, biology and culture, social theory and human biology at American University in Washington DC.

Selected publications

References 

American women archaeologists
African-American archaeologists
American anthropologists
American women anthropologists
Howard University alumni
University of Maryland, College Park alumni
University of North Carolina at Chapel Hill alumni
Living people
American archaeologists
Year of birth missing (living people)
21st-century African-American people
21st-century African-American women